Philira is a genus of spiders in the family Salticidae. It was first described in 2015 by Edwards. , it contains 2 South American species.

References

Salticidae
Salticidae genera
Spiders of South America